BET+ is an over-the-top SVOD service operated by Tyler Perry Studios and Paramount Streaming, a division of Paramount Global. The service was first announced on June 24, 2019 and launched on September 19, 2019.

BET+ features both original films and television series from the BET program library and will be the exclusive home of programming produced by Tyler Perry as part of BET's overall deal with Perry. Will Packer and Tracy Oliver have also signed on to produce original programming for the service.

BET+ was part of Viacom's 2017 turnaround strategy, which saw the company acquiring and investing into digital platforms. Prior to the announcement of BET+, Viacom acquired the free streaming platform Pluto TV on March 4, 2019 and launched several channels branded after Viacom-owned cable networks and IPs, including BET-branded channels.

History

In 2017, Viacom launched BET Play, which carried BET original content and was not available in the United States. The same year, Tyler Perry signed a deal with Viacom, lasting until 2024, which would give him part ownership in BET+. On June 24, 2019, BET+ was announced as a joint venture between BET Networks and Tyler Perry Studios, set to launch in the fall of that year. On September 9, 2019, BET set an official launch date of September 19, 2019 and announced Devin Griffin as general manager of the streaming service. The service launched on September 19 that year. BET+ accounted for half of subscriber growth and nearly all revenue growth for BET in 2021.

Original programming

Drama

Comedy

Unscripted

Docuseries

Reality

Co-productions
These shows have been commissioned by BET+ in cooperation with a partner from another country.

Continuations
These shows have been picked up by BET+ for additional seasons after having aired previous seasons on another network.

Exclusive international distribution
These shows have been acquired by BET+ for exclusive first-run release in the United States.

Original films

Feature films

Stand-up comedy specials

Specials

Upcoming original programming

Drama

Comedy

In development

Notes

References

External links 
 

2019 establishments in Washington, D.C.
BET Networks
 
Paramount Streaming
Internet properties established in 2019
Internet television streaming services
Subscription video on demand services
Joint ventures